West Pasaman Regency is a regency (kabupaten) of West Sumatra, Indonesia. It has an area of 3,887.77 km2, and it had a population of 365,129 at the 2010 Census and 431,672 at the 2020 Census. The seat of the regency administration is the town of Simpang Ampek.

Administrative districts
West Pasaman Regency is divided into eleven districts (kecamatan), tabulated below with their areas and their populations at the 2010 Census  and the 2020 Census. The table also includes the location of the district administrative centres, and the number of administrative villages (desa and kelurahan) in each district.

Note: (a) includes 12 offshore islands.

Airport
Pusako Anak Nagari Airport is an airport that located in Luhak Nan Duo district, West Pasaman Regency

Mount Talamau
Talamau Peak (2,900 masl) can be accessed from Bundaran Simpang Ampek Pasaman vice versa in two or three days trip and located at Jorong Pinagar Nagari Aur Kuning, Pasaman District, West Pasaman Regency. Mount Talamau has more than 10 waterfalls and at around the peak there are also more than 10 lakes surrounding by many kinds of colourful flowers.

References

External links 

 

Regencies of West Sumatra